Albert Bridge (2001 pop.: 159) is a Canadian rural community in Nova Scotia's Cape Breton Regional Municipality.

Situated on the Mira River, the community was previously named Mira Ferry for the location of a small ferry crossing the river.   It received its present name after Albert Munro, the son of William Henry Munro, Nova Scotia's representative in the British Parliament who used his influence to have the ferry replaced with a bridge in 1849.

The Mira River offers numerous water-based recreational opportunities during the summer months, including swimming, boating and canoeing. The bridge connects the two sides of the community, straddling the river.

The community's economy is tied to the summer recreational months with numerous cottages making the area most active during this time; much of the business activity is centred on servicing these seasonal residents.

Trunk 22 is the main road through the village and connects Sydney and Louisbourg.

Nearby attractions
 Mira River Provincial Park, near Albert Bridge, off Trunk 22
 Albert Bridge - The eponymous bridge built during the 1970s replacing an older bridge that crossed the Mira River. Though officially discouraged, the northwestern portion of the span is a popular platform for bridge diving and jumping into the water below
 Union Church in Mira Ferry - Built in 1857, is the oldest Presbyterian Church in Cape Breton.

Notable residents
Allister MacGillivray, songwriter
Ciaran MacGillivray, musician, Allister's son

Notes

Communities in the Cape Breton Regional Municipality